The Barbershop Harmony Society, legally and historically named the Society for the Preservation and Encouragement of Barber Shop Quartet Singing in America, Inc. (SPEBSQSA), is the first of several organizations to promote and preserve barbershop music as an art form. Founded by Owen C. Cash and Rupert I. Hall in Tulsa, Oklahoma in 1938, the organization quickly grew, promoting barbershop harmony among men of all ages. As of 2014, just under 23,000 men in the United States and Canada were members of this organization whose focus is on a cappella music.  The international headquarters was in Kenosha, Wisconsin for fifty years before moving to Nashville, Tennessee in 2007. In June 2018, the society announced it would allow women to join as full members.

A parallel women's singing organization, Sweet Adelines International (SAI) was founded in 1945. A second women's barbershop harmony organization, Harmony, Incorporated, broke from SAI in 1959 over an issue of racial exclusion, with SAI (like SPEBSQSA and many other organizations) being white-only at that time; SPEBSQSA officially lifted the requirement in 1963. Several international affiliate organizations, in countries around the world, add their own flavor to the signature sound of barbershop harmony.

Name

The original name SPEBSQSA was intended as a lampoon on Roosevelt's New Deal alphabet agencies.  Because of the name's length and the difficult-to-pronounce acronym, society staff and members often refer to SPEBSQSA as The Society. For decades, SPEBSQSA was the official name, while the Barbershop Harmony Society was an officially recognized and sanctioned alternate. Members were encouraged to use the alternate name, because it was felt that the official name was an in-joke that did not resonate outside the Society. In mid-2004, faced with declining membership, the Society adopted a marketing plan that called for using "Barbershop Harmony Society" consistently and retaining the old name for certain legal purposes.

The old official name spelled "barber shop" as two words, while barbershop is generally used elsewhere.

In reference to the acronym SPEBSQSA, The Society has said "attempts to pronounce the name are discouraged". Unofficially, it is sometimes pronounced as if it were spelled "Spebsqua".

Sharp Harmony, a Norman Rockwell painting, appeared on the cover of The Saturday Evening Post magazine issue dated September 26, 1936; it depicts a barber and three clients enjoying a cappella song. The image was adopted by SPEBSQSA in its promotion of the art.

In late 2004, the Society established Barbershop Harmony Society as its new "brand name", with a logo and identity program released in 2005. The legal name remained SPEBSQSA, Inc.

Preservation
A key aspect of the Society's mission is in the preservation of barbershop music.  To this end, it maintains the Old Songs Library. Holding over 100,000 titles (750,000 sheets) this is the largest sheet music collection in the world excepting only the Library of Congress.

The "Barberpole Cat Program" is a collection of 12 songs (commonly known as "polecats") that are considered standard repertoire for every barbershopper ("Let Me Call You Sweetheart", "My Wild Irish Rose", etc.)  Every member receives a booklet upon joining the society. The purpose of this collection is so that whenever any barbershoppers meet they will always have something ready to sing. The society has also published collections such as Strictly Barbershop.

Harmony Foundation International, a 501(c)(3) not-for-profit organization, was incorporated in 1959 as a charitable subsidiary of the Barbershop Harmony Society; it raises financial support for the society's programs.

Headquarters and membership

In 2003, in preparation for a new headquarters location, the Society sold both Harmony Hall, a historic lakefront mansion in Kenosha, Wisconsin, and its nearby facility (known as Harmony Hall West) located in a strip mall which the Society purchased in 1976 and renovated. HHW had housed finance, merchandising, IT and membership. Operations and staff from both buildings were consolidated into a remodeled HHW.

In 2006 the Society announced plans to move its headquarters to Nashville, Tennessee. In August 2007, the Society completed the relocation to 110 Seventh Avenue North, in Nashville.

In June 2018, the society announced it would allow women to join as full members, with each chapter deciding whether to remain all-male or add a mixed or all-women's chorus. Since 2009, women had been allowed to join as associates.

Contests and awards
To promote and improve barbershop singing, the society annually runs international and district-level contests for choruses and quartets.

When a quartet wins the international gold medal, the foursome is considered champions forever and may not compete again. A chorus that wins the gold, however, must sit out of competition for only two years and thus may compete for the gold medal again in the third year following their win.

International quartet champions

Chorus champions

 The Vocal Majority, based in Dallas, Texas, thirteen-time International Chorus Champions (1975, 1979, 1982, 1985, 1988, 1991, 1994, 1997, 2000, 2003, 2006, 2014, 2018) – the chorus with the most international gold medals, ten of which were in succession (each time the chorus was eligible to compete) until 2009.
 The Ambassadors of Harmony, based in St. Charles, Missouri, International Chorus Champions in 2004, 2009, 2012 and 2016.  Their 2009 championship interrupted the Vocal Majority's streak at 10 consecutive championships.
 The Masters of Harmony, nine-time International Chorus Champions (1990, 1993, 1996, 1999, 2002, 2005, 2008, 2011, 2017).
 The Westminster Chorus, a youth barbershop chorus in California started by young members of the Masters of Harmony, International Champion in 2007, 2010, 2015 and 2019.
 The Louisville Thoroughbreds Chorus, the society's first 7-time International Champion chorus won the gold medal in 1962, 1966, 1969, 1974, 1978, 1981 and 1984.

BHS Awards
In 2020, the society inaugurated an annual Awards Gala to "amplify and celebrate" those who have impacted the barbershop genre via excellence and service. Award nominations are accepted from January into February, selected nominees announced in April, and winners made known during the black tie gala held early in the week of the international contests. Awards are given for the Barbershopper, Quartet, Ensemble, Arranger, Innovator, Ambassador, Album, and Video of the Year, as well as Lifetime Achievement for an Arranger. Several pre-existent awards and honors are also now announced at the gala, including Hall of Fame, Honorary Membership, Harmony Fellows (50-year members) and the Joe Liles Lifetime Achievement Award (for a chorus director). With the inaugural year's international convention canceled due to COVID-19, a virtual awards event was held on September 14, 2020.

Districts  
For purposes of administration, particularly of local education and contests, the society is organized into 17 geographical districts as follows. (Chapter quantities are as of November 2017.)

Affiliates
 British Association of Barbershop Singers (BABS) – United Kingdom: 60 choruses
 Barbershop Harmony Australia (BHA) – Australia: 41 choruses
 Barbershop Harmony New Zealand (BHNZ) – New Zealand: 15 choruses
 Barbershop in Germany (BinG!) – Germany: 22 choruses
 Dutch Association of Barbershop Singers (Holland Harmony) – Netherlands: 28 choruses
 Finnish Association of Barbershop Singers (FABS) – Finland: 4 choruses
 Irish Association of Barbershop Singers (IABS) – Ireland: 12 choruses
 Spanish Association of Barbershop Singers (SABS) – Spain: 7 choruses
  (SNOBS) – Sweden: 9 choruses
 Southern Part of Africa Tonsorial Singers (SPATS) – South Africa

See also
 A cappella music
 Barbershop Arrangements
 Barbershop music
 Harmony, Incorporated Women's Barbershop organization
 Sweet Adelines International Women's Barbershop organization
 American Harmony documentary film about barbershop music
 List of Barbershop Harmony Society chorus champions

References

Further reading
 Robert A. Stebbins (1996). The Barbershop Singer: Inside the Social world of a Musical Hobby. Toronto: University of Toronto Press.

External links

The Barbershop Wiki Project
Inside Look Sweet Adelines International Employee Reviews
P.R.O.B.E. website
Barberscore, BHS "contest manager"

 
American vocal groups
Barbershop quartets
Culture of Nashville, Tennessee
Men's musical groups
Music education organizations
Music organizations based in the United States
Organizations based in Nashville, Tennessee
Musical groups established in 1938